Sean Nelson (born June 12, 1973) is an American musician and journalist. He was the lead singer of the alternative rock group Harvey Danger and is the arts editor for The Stranger newspaper in Seattle, Washington.

Music career 

Nelson is a graduate of Episcopal High School in Alexandria, Virginia and was a classmate of Paul DePodesta, Courtenay Bram Anderson, and Humphreys McGee.

Nelson joined Harvey Danger in 1993 and played with the band through to its farewell show in 2009. In addition to being the band's lead singer, he was also its songwriter and keyboardist. The band's debut album Where Have All the Merrymakers Gone? was released in 1997 and was certified Gold by the RIAA for sales of 500,000 copies.  The album contained the hit single "Flagpole Sitta", which was featured in the 1999 film American Pie and was later used as the theme song for the British sitcom Peep Show.

In 2001, Nelson formed a second band, The Long Winters, with John Roderick. He left the band in 2004, and Roderick has continued the group as a largely solo effort.

Nelson has also recorded and performed with Death Cab for Cutie, The Decemberists, Robyn Hitchcock, Nada Surf, The Minus 5, and others. In 2006, he recorded Nelson Sings Nilsson, an album of songs by the late American composer Harry Nilsson, accompanied by a 25-piece-orchestra. Nelson was also a member of the short-lived side project The Vernacular, along with Chris Walla and Nathan Good of Death Cab For Cutie.

On June 4, 2013, Nelson released his first official batch of recordings to bear his name, Make Good Choices, which includes contributions from Chris Walla (Death Cab for Cutie), Peter Buck (R.E.M./Minus 5), Matt Pence & Scott Danbom (Centro-Matic), Howard Draper (Shearwater), Dave Depper (Loch Lomond, Fruit Bats), Rachel Blumberg (The Decemberists/M. Ward), Adam Selzer (Norfolk & Western), Steve Fisk (player: Pell Mell, Pigeonhed; producer: Nirvana, Beat Happening, Unwound), and others. Sessions arose over the course of several years between Nelson and his collaborators' other projects.

In June 2019, Nelson released the decades-in-the-making album of Harry Nilsson covers, titled "Nelson Sings Nilsson," a play on Nilsson's classic album of Randy Newman covers, Nilsson Sings Newman.

In December 2019, Sean released the "Viral Love" 7" which contained the first song released from a new full-length album he made with producer Shane Tutmarc. The b-side contained an alternate version of Harvey Danger's "Carlotta Valdez."

Writing career
Nelson joined the staff of the Seattle alternative weekly newspaper The Stranger in 1996 while still a member of Harvey Danger. He has held several positions at the publication, including web editor, film editor, copy editor, associate editor, and arts editor.

In 2006, Nelson published his first book, an entry in the 33⅓ series on Joni Mitchell's Court and Spark. His essay "Dead Man Talking" was published in the Da Capo anthology Best Music Writing 2008.

In addition to his writing work, Nelson taught a songwriting class at the University of Washington Extension and co-hosted Audioasis on KEXP-FM for five years.

Film career
In 2008, Nelson co-wrote and played a supporting role in Humpday director Lynn Shelton's third feature film My Effortless Brilliance, which enjoyed a successful run on the film festival circuit and was released on DVD by IFC Films in November 2009. He has also acted in David Russo's cult film festival hit The Immaculate Conception of Little Dizzle and alongside Dax Shepard in Katie Aselton's The Freebie, which was released in September 2010.

Selected discography
(as harmony vocalist, except where noted)

Sean Nelson
(lead singer, songwriter*)
 Make Good Choices (Really Records, 2013)
 Nelson Sings Nilsson (2019) *Album of Harry Nilsson covers
 Viral Love b/w Carlotta Valdez Goes to Texas 7" (2019)

Harvey Danger
(lead singer, keyboards, songwriter)

 Where Have All the Merrymakers Gone? (Universal, 1998)
 King James Version (Warner, 2000)
 Sometimes You Have To Work on Christmas (Sometimes) EP (Phonographic Records, 2004)
 Little By Little… (Kill Rock Stars, 2006)
 Cream and Bastards Rise EP (Kill Rock Stars, 2006)
 Little Round Mirrors EP (Barsuk, 2007)
 Burn to Shine (V/A Trixie DVD, 2008)
 Dead Sea Scrolls (Phonographic Records, 2009)

The Long Winters

 The Worst You Can Do is Harm (Barsuk, 2001)
 When I Pretend to Fall (Barsuk, 2003)
 Putting the Days to Bed (Barsuk, 2005)

Nada Surf

 The Weight is a Gift (Barsuk, 2006)
 Lucky (Barsuk, 2008)

References

External links

Sean Nelson Music Page on Facebook
Biography and articles at The Stranger
LAist Interview with Sean Nelson
Sean Nelson tour diary for Entertainment Weekly
Time Out NY interview with Sean Nelson

1973 births
Living people
American male singer-songwriters
American singer-songwriters
American music critics
Journalists from Washington (state)
Harvey Danger members
The Long Winters members
The Minus 5 members
The Stranger (newspaper) people
American male non-fiction writers
20th-century American singers
21st-century American singers
20th-century American male singers
21st-century American male singers